The  is Japanese aerial lift line in Otari, Nagano, operated by . The Tōkyū Group company also operates Tsugaike Gondola (Gondola Lift Eve), a gondola lift line connected to Tsugaike Ropeway. The two lines are collectively called . It transports tourists to Tsugaike Natural Park, mainly in summer. Tsugaike Gondola Lift, on the other hand, is open the whole year, and mainly transports skiers.

Basic data
System: Aerial tramway, 1 track cable and 2 haulage ropes
Cable length: 
Vertical interval: 
Maximum gradient: 24°06′
Operational speed: 7.0 m/s
Passenger capacity per a cabin: 71
Cabins: 2
Stations: 2

See also
List of aerial lifts in Japan

External links
 Official website

Aerial tramways in Japan